Roy Harper (born 2 April 1929) is a former Australian rules footballer who played with Footscray in the Victorian Football League (VFL). His brother Bruce Harper was also an Australian rules footballer.

Notes

External links 

		

Living people
1929 births
Australian rules footballers from Victoria (Australia)
Western Bulldogs players
Sandringham Football Club players